Diego Daniel Pave (born 29 April 1985 in Concarán, San Luis Province) is an Argentine footballer that plays in the position of Goalkeeper. His current club is San Martín de Tucumán team in the third tier of Argentine football.

Pave began his career with Club Atlético Boca Juniors.

Clubes

References

External links 
 
 
 
 

1985 births
Living people
People from San Luis Province
San Martín de Tucumán footballers
Association football goalkeepers
Argentine footballers
Club Almagro players